Gim Jeong-hui (김정희, 金正喜, ; 1786 ~ 1856), also known as Kim Jeong-hui, was one of the most celebrated practitioners of calligraphy, epigraphists, and scholars of Korea’s later Joseon period. He was a member of the Gyeongju Gim clan. He used various Ho (pen-names): Wandang (阮堂), Chusa (秋史), Yedang (禮堂), Siam (詩庵), Gwapa (果坡), Nogwa (老果) etc. (some 200 in all).  He is especially celebrated for having transformed Korean epigraphy and for having created the “Chusa-che” (秋史體 Chusa writing style) inspired by his study of ancient Korean and Chinese epitaphs. His ink paintings, especially of orchids, are equally admired.

As a scholar, he belonged to the Silhak (Practical Learning) school also known as the Bukhak (北學, “Northern Learning”). He was related to Queen Jeongsun, the second wife of King Yeongjo, and by his adoptive mother, Nam Yang-hong, he was a cousin to Namyeon-gun Yi Gu, who was destined to be the grandfather of King Gojong (高宗, later titled 光武帝 Gwangmu Emperor. 1852–1919). Heungseon Daewongun (興宣大院君, 1820–1898), King Gojong’s father who served as his regent and was also a noted calligrapher, was one of Gim’s pupils for a while.

Biography

Early life: Birth and family
Gim was born in the family home in Yesan, now South Chungcheong Province, in 1786. He was the eldest son. His birth father was Gim No-gyeong (金魯敬, 1766 - 1840); his grandfather was Gim I-ju (金頤柱, ? – 1797) and his great-grandfather was Weolseongui Gim Han-sin (月城尉 金漢藎, 1720–1758) who married the second daughter of King Yeongjo, the Princess Hwasun (和順翁主, 1720 - 1758). His ancestors and relatives held many high administrative positions and several were noted for their calligraphy. His mother was a member of the Gigye Yu clan, a daughter of Yu Jun-ju (兪駿柱), the governor of Gimhae.

He is reputed to have been a remarkable calligrapher already as a child. When he was 7, the famed scholar Chae Je-gong (蔡濟恭, 1720 - 1799) is said to have been impressed on seeing the “Ipchun Daegil Cheonha Daepyeongchun” (立春大吉 天下太平春) good-luck charm marking the coming of spring that he had written, pasted on the gate of the family home. From the age of 15 he received instruction from the celebrated Bukhak (北學, “Northern Learning)” scholar Pak Je-ga (朴齊家, 1750–1805).

Early youth
In the 1790s, the head of the family, his eldest uncle, Gim No-yeong (金魯永, 1747–1707), was sent into exile, while another uncle as well as his grandparents all died in quick succession. It was decided that Gim Jeong-hui should be adopted by Gim No-yeong (who had several daughters but no son) and so become the next head of the family. When he was 15, in 1800, he married a member of the Hansan Yi clan (閑山李氏). That same year, King Jeongjo died and Queen Jeongsun, the widow of the previous King Yeongjo, became regent, since the new king was only a child. Gim Jeong-hui's birth father benefitted from the family's relationship with the regent and was raised to a high rank.

Later youth
Gim Jeong-hui's birth mother died in 1801, aged only 34. Queen Jeongsun died in 1805, and Gim Jeong-hui's young wife died only a few weeks after her. His teacher Pak Je-ga also died that year and these multiple deaths seem to have encouraged his already deep interest in Buddhism as a source of consolation and meaning. His adoptive mother also died at around this time and once mourning for her was over, he married a slightly younger second wife in 1808, a member of the Yean Yi clan (禮安 李氏). In 1809 he took first place in the lower Gwageo civil examination.

Adult life

Visit to China
In 1810, his birth-father was appointed a vice-envoy in the annual embassy to Qing China and he accompanied him, spending some 6 months in China. There he met such noted scholars as Weng Fanggang (翁方綱, 1733–1818) and Ruan Yuan (阮元, 1764–1849) who recognized his qualities. He seems to have studied documentary history there especially. Ruan Yuan gave him a copy of his “Su Zhai Biji” (蘇齋筆記), a book about calligraphy, and Gim continued to correspond with them after his return to Korea. For a time after returning home he did not take up any official position but continued to study the Northern Learning and write essays criticizing rigid Neo-Confucianism.

He also pursued research by visiting and studying the inscriptions on ancient stele. In 1815, the Venerable Cho-ui first visited Seoul and met Gim Jeong-hui there. This was the beginning of a deep and lasting relationship. Perhaps it was from this time that Gim began to drink tea, there is no knowing.

Success in national exams
Passing the Gwageo national exam held to mark an eclipse year in 1819, he rose to such positions as secret inspector and tutor to the Crown Prince. Following the death of the prince, power passed to the conservative Andong Gim clan and Gim was reduced in rank while his adoptive father was exiled for several years, until 1834. In 1835, after the accession of King Heonjong, the family's fortunes turned and Gim Jeong-hui rose to ministerial rank. In the same year he visited the Ven. Cho-ui at Daedun-sa temple (大芚寺), now called Daeheung-sa).

Exile
Following the death of King Sunjo of Joseon (r. 1800–1834) late in 1834, Queen Sunwon, the wife of Sunjo and a member of the Gim clan of Andong, held immense power after her grandson, Heonjong (憲宗, 1827–1849 ), still only a child, was made king. Queen Gim acted as his regent. Factional in-fighting increased and in 1840, when he was due to be a member of the Chinese embassy, Gim Jeong-hui was instead condemned to exile in Jeju Island. Late in 1842 his wife died. He was finally allowed to return home early in 1849. It was during those years in exile that he developed the calligraphic style known as the “Chusa style,” based on his studies of models dating back to the earliest periods of Korean and Chinese history. On his way into exile and on his way back home afterward, he visited the Venerable Cho-ui in his Ilchi-am hermitage at what is now known as Daeheung-sa temple. Cho-ui consecrated several of his building projects in the temple to helping sustain Gim during his exile and visited him in Jeju-do 5-6 times, bringing him gifts of tea. .

In 1844, during his exile in Jeju Island, he produced his most celebrated ink painting, usually known as “Sehando” or “Wandang Sehando” (阮堂歲寒圖, ‘Wandang’ was one of Gim's most frequently used ‘Ho’ names; ‘Sehan’ means ‘the bitter cold around the lunar new year,’ ‘do’ means ‘painting’), which he gave to his disciple Yi Sang-jeok (李尙迪, 1804–1865) in gratitude for his friendship, which included bringing him precious books from China. The painting shows a simple house, barely outlined, framed by two gnarled pine trees. Beside it there are texts expressing gratitude to Yi Sang-jeok. Yi was an outstanding figure, a poet and calligrapher who went 12 times to China and was greatly admired by the scholars he met there. In 1845, Yi returned to China with the painting, which he showed to the scholars he met. Sixteen of them composed appreciatiative colophons which were attached to the left side of the painting, creating a lengthy scroll. After Yi's return to Korea, some Korean scholars also added their tributes, creating a unique cumulative work combining painting, poetic writing and calligraphy.

Soon after King Heonjong in 1849, there were disputes over the relocation of his tomb, in which a friend of Gim Jeong-hui, Gwon Don-in, was involved. as a result, both were sent into exile, Gim spending the years 1850–2 in Bukcheong, Hamgyeong-do province, far in the North.

Final years
After the northern exile, he settled in Gwacheon (to the south of Seoul, where his birth father was buried) in a house he called Gwaji Chodang (瓜地草堂). In 1856 he went to stay for a while in Bongeun-sa temple, in what is now Seoul's Gangnam area, and is said to have become a monk. Later that same year he returned to his home in Gwacheon, and continued to write until the day before he died.

In the years following his death, his disciple Nam Byeong-gil and others prepared and published collections of his letters (Wandang Cheokdok 阮堂尺牘) and of his poems (Damyeon Jaesigo 覃糧齋詩藁) in 1867; a collection of his other writings (Wandangjip 阮堂集) was published in 1868. A complete edition of his works, (Wandang Seonsaeng Jeonjip 阮堂先生全集), was published by his great-great-grandson Gim Ik-hwan (金翊煥) in 1934.

Achievements
The influence of Gim Jeong-hui among the Korean scholars of the later 19th century was immense. He was reputed to have taught 3,000 of them and was seen as the leader of a modernizing trend that developed into the Gaehwapa Enlightenment Party at the end of the 19th century. Among the names associated with him we find Shin Wi (申緯, 1769–1845), O Gyeong-seok (吳慶錫, 1831–1879), Min Tae-ho (閔台鎬, 1834–1884), Min Gyu-ho (閔奎鎬, 1836–1878), Gang Wi (姜瑋, 1820–1884).

His main scholarly interest was in documentary history and monumental inscriptions. He maintained correspondence on these topics with major scholars in China. He was particularly celebrated for having deciphered and identified the stele on Mount Bukhan commemorating a visit by King Jinheung of Silla (540–576). He is remembered for his outstanding achievements in calligraphy, ink painting, as well as his writings in prose and poetry. He was in the habit of devising a special Ho (pen-name) for himself whenever he dedicated a painting of orchids to an acquaintance, so that he became the person of his generation with the most such names.

Buddhism
It seems that Gim Jeong-hui was accustomed to frequenting Buddhist temples from his childhood onward. There are indications that the sudden death in or around 1805 of several of those he had been close to drove him to deepen his Buddhist practice. Among his calligraphic work, a number of copies of Buddhist Sūtras and other texts survive and he wrote name boards for halls in Daeheung-sa, Bongeun-sa and other temples. The reformists of the Practical Learning tradition often showed an interest in either Catholicism or Buddhism, as part of their reaction against the rigidly secular Neo-Confucianist philosophy.

He was especially close to the Ven. Cho-ui Seonsa (草衣禪師, Uiseon (意恂, 1786–1866) and Baekpa Daesa (白坡大師, Geungseon 亘璇, 1767–1852).

In 1815, Cho-ui first visited Seoul and established strong relationships with a number of highly educated scholar-officials, several of whom had been to China, who became his friends and followers. These included the son-in-law of King Jeongjo (正祖 r. 1776–1800), Haegeo-doin Hong Hyeon-Ju 海居 道人 洪顯周 (1793–1865) and his brother Yeoncheon Hong Seok-Ju 淵泉 洪奭周 (1774–1842), the son of Dasan Jeong Yak-yong, Unpo Jeong Hak-Yu 耘逋 丁學游 (1786–1855), as well as Gim Jeong-Hui and his brothers Sanchon Gim Myeong-hui 山泉 金命喜 (1788–1857) and Geummi Gim Sang-hu 琴糜 金相喜 (1794–1861). It was most unusual for a Buddhist monk, who as such was assigned the lowest rank in society, to be recognized as a poet and thinker in this way by members of the Confucian establishment. As a monk, Cho-ui was not allowed to enter the city walls of Seoul and had to receive visits from these scholars while living in Cheongnyangsa temple 淸涼寺 outside the capital's eastern gate or in a hermitage in the hills to the north.

Gim Jeong-Hui had initiated a controversy with the other celebrated Seon Master Baekpa Geungseon (白坡 亘璇, 1767–1852) who had written the Seonmun sugyeong (禪文手鏡 Hand Glass of Seon Literature). In his Baekpa Mangjeungsipojo (白坡 妄證十五條 Fifteen Signs of Baekpa's Senility), Gim wrote, “The truth of Seon is like a light new dress without stitching, just like a heavenly dress. But the dress is patched and repatched by the inventiveness of humans, and so becomes a wornout piece of clothing.” Baekpa had written that certain traditions were superior to others, and Gim considered such quibbles to be a waste of time as well as a misunderstanding of the nature of Seon. Nonetheless, when Baekpa died at Hwaeom-sa Temple in 1852, Gim wrote an epitaph for him: 華嚴宗主白坡大律師大機大用之碑.[6]

Family 
Parents
Biological father: Kim No-kyung (김노경)
Biological mother: Daughter of Yoo Junju (유준주)
Brother: Kim Myeong-hui (김명희)
Brother: Kim Sang-hui (김상희)
Adoptive father: Kim No-yeong (김노영)
Adoptive mother: Daughter of Hong Dae-hyeon (홍대현)
Wives and issues:
Lady Yi, of the Hansan Yi clan (한산이씨)
Kim Sang-mu (김상무), adopted son
Lady Yi, the Yean Yi clan (예안 이씨)
Lady Han, of the Han clan (한씨)
Kim Sang-U (김상우), first son

Gallery

References

Further reading

There are no extended studies or resources devoted to Gim Jeong-Hui in English.
The single most extensive Internet site in Korean devoted exclusively to Gim Jeong-hui www.chusa.or.kr has been established under the auspices of the Gwacheon local government.
The Moam Collection owns the largest number of works by Gim Jeong-hui and the Moam Collection home page includes a Gallery with images of many works.
There is an extended page in Korean devoted to him  in the Academy of Korean Studies own pages.
Another online resource in Korean about Gim Jeong-hui is the page about him in the EncyKorea (also a resource administered by the AKS). There is a page devoted to Gim in the Korean Wikipedia.

1786 births
1856 deaths
19th-century Korean calligraphers
Gim clan of Gyeongju
19th-century Korean philosophers
19th-century Korean painters
Buddhist artists
19th-century Korean poets